Amblymora carinipennis is a species of beetle in the family Cerambycidae. It was described by Breuning in 1974. It is known from the Celebes Islands.

References

Amblymora
Beetles described in 1974